Roy Curry (born November 9, 1939) is a former American football player who played in six games for the 1963 Pittsburgh Steelers of the NFL. He played college football at Jackson State.

References

1939 births
Living people
Jackson State Tigers football players
Pittsburgh Steelers players
American football wide receivers